William F. "Bill" Fivaz (born February 26, 1934) is an American numismatist and author.

Early Life
Fivaz attended Hamilton College in Clinton, New York, graduating in 1956.

Career
Fivaz has written over a dozen books focused on numismatics/coin collecting, and is best known as the co-author of The Cherrypickers' Guide to Rare Die Varieties, first published in 1990 and subsequently re-issued six times. He was named 2001 "Numismatist of the Year" by the American Numismatic Association, and served as an association governor from 1985 to 1989. Fivaz is the recipient of the ANA's highest honor, the Farran Zerbe Memorial Award (1995), is a two-time Medal of Merit honoree (1984 and 1989), and a two-time M. Vernon Sheldon Memorial Audio/Visual Award recipient. In 1981 he was named ANA Outstanding Adult Advisor.

In 1999, Fivaz released Helpful Hints For Enjoying Coin Collecting. In 2005, he wrote United States Gold Counterfeit Detection Guide, published by Whitman Publishing, to aid collectors in distinguishing between real and fake gold coins.

In November 2020, Fivaz's "World's Worst Type Set", featuring coins graded "Poor-1" and "Fair-2", was auctioned by Stack's Bowers Galleries.

In 2021, Fivaz was named one of Coin World Most Influential People in Numismatics (1960-2020). In June 2022, Fivaz was part of a team of five numismatists who re-classified the 1943 over 42 Lincoln cent as an overdate variety, in addition to its previously known doubled die status.

The American Numismatic Association named one of their Young Numismatist Literary Awards after Fivaz, where articles submitted by children ages 8–12 can win awards and numismatic books.

Fivaz was a regional sales manager for Nestle out of its Atlanta offices.

Personal life
Fivaz is married to Marilyn, and they have two children, Bill and Diane.

References

American numismatists
1934 births
Living people